Thomas Henzinger (born 1962) is an Austrian computer scientist, researcher, and former president of the Institute of Science and Technology, Austria.

Life and career
Henzinger was born in Austria. He received his bachelor's degree in computer science from Johannes Kepler University Linz, and his PhD from Stanford University in 1991, advised by Zohar Manna.  He is married to Monika Henzinger and has three children.

He was successively Assistant Professor of Computer Science at Cornell University (1992–95) and  Assistant Professor (1996–97), Associate Professor (1997–98), Professor (1998–2004) and Adjunct Professor (till 2011) of Electrical Engineering and Computer Sciences at the University of California, Berkeley. He was also director of the Max Planck Institute of Computer Science in Saarbrücken, Germany in 1999 and Professor of Computer and Communication Sciences at EPFL (the Swiss Federal Institute of Technology in Lausanne), Switzerland from 2004 to 2009. Until 2022, he was president of the Institute of Science and Technology Austria (ISTA).

His research is concerned with modern systems theory, particularly on the models, algorithms, and tools for the design and verification of reliable software, hardware, and embedded systems. His HyTech tool was the first model checker for mixed discrete-continuous systems.

He is a member of Academy of Sciences Leopoldina, Austrian Academy of Sciences, Academia Europaea, and Institute of Electrical and Electronics Engineers.
 
He was awarded the 2015 Milner Award by the Royal Society. He received a Doctor honoris causa from the Masaryk University as well as the Wittgenstein Prize of the Austrian Science Fund. He is an ACM Fellow and an ISI Highly Cited Researcher in 2001. He is ranked as the number one cited researcher in Austria according to h-index data.

References

External links
 Archive of the page at EPFL
 Home Page at the Berkeley EECS Department
 Page at ISTA
 Page at the Austrian Academy of Sciences
 

1962 births
Living people
Stanford University alumni
Austrian computer scientists
Foreign associates of the National Academy of Sciences